Muriel Bolton Freeman (9 September 1897 – 1980) was an English foil fencer. She competed at the 1924 and 1928 Olympics and won a silver medal in 1928, placing fourth in 1924.

References

External links
 

1897 births
1980 deaths
British female foil fencers
Olympic fencers of Great Britain
Fencers at the 1924 Summer Olympics
Fencers at the 1928 Summer Olympics
Olympic silver medallists for Great Britain
Olympic medalists in fencing
Medalists at the 1928 Summer Olympics
20th-century British women